Maihuenia poepigii, commonly known in Chile as maihuén or hierba del guanaco, is a succulent cactus shrub native to Chile and Argentina. M. poepigii is remarkably tolerant to moisture and cold temperatures.

The specific epithet poepigii commemorates Eduard Pöppig, a 19th-century German naturalist who explored South America.

Description
This is a cactus species forming dense cushions often consisting of hundreds of individual segments. The plant's specific physical characteristics are listed below:

 Leaves: Small and succulent.
 Flowers: Showy, large, satiny and lemon-yellow in color. It flowers in late spring.

References

Maihuenioideae
Flora of Chile
Flora of Argentina